Ian Charles Jarvie (born 8 July 1937) is a philosopher trained in England, long resident in Canada. Jarvie was educated at Dover Grammar School for Boys from 1948 to 1955. He studied at the London School of Economics under Karl Popper where he gained his B.Sc. (Econ.) and Ph.D. (1955-1962). Between 1960 and 1962 he was a Philosophy tutor at the London School of Economics, before accepting lectureships in Hong Kong and at the University of York, Ontario. Jarvie is a member of the Royal Society of Canada and managing editor of the journal Philosophy of the Social Sciences.

The philosophy of social science and the movie industry are two of his main topics of research. He is a professor at York University in Toronto.

Jarvie's philosophical temperament is influenced by his former teacher, Karl Popper. Other influences include: David Hume, Bertrand Russell, and Ernest Gellner.
Further, Jarvie's philosophical method owes a debt to training in social anthropology. In this vein, he has published anthropological work on the cargo cults of the South Pacific and has contributed anthropological studies on the media.  His adherence to functionalism in the study of the social differs from that of Durkheim (and his followers) in holding that knowledge and ideas must be presented as causal variables. Further, Jarvie contends, it must be the case that a functionalist framework with an active role for explanatory ideas requires a conception of rationality towards ideas. Politically, Jarvie is a liberal.

Major works
 
 
 
 
 
 
 The social philosophy of Ernest Gellner - co-edited with John A. Hall

Online papers
Index to Online Publications

References

 
 

1937 births
Living people
Alumni of the London School of Economics
Fellows of the Royal Society of Canada
Academic staff of York University
Philosophers of social science